Claremont Lincoln University (CLU) is a regionally accredited private nonprofit online university in Claremont, California. It offers a number of master's degree programs.

History 
In March 2008, the Board of Trustees at Claremont School of Theology voted to establish a new university focused on interfaith dialogue. The purpose of the “University Project”, as it was known at the time, was to create a new educational environment in which representatives of the world’s religions could study together and address key social problems – including religious violence. The Claremont School of Theology Board officially incorporated the University in January 2010, the name of the University was first revealed on May 16, 2011, and classes launched in Fall 2011.  The founding president was Jerry D. Campbell.

In spring 2014, the University decided to shift beyond its original inter-religious focus. It began creating educational programs and degrees that built on its commitment to its core tenets (fostering collaboration, civil dialogue, and addressing key social problems), but that was not dependent on faith, spirituality, or religion to achieve. As a result, Claremont Lincoln and Claremont School of Theology decided to separate, and students whose programs were discontinued by Claremont Lincoln were offered admission into Claremont School of Theology, where they were able to complete their degrees. Claremont Lincoln then began to work towards independent accreditation which it achieved in 2016.

In 2021, CLU appointed Dr. Lynn Priddy as President of the university. Priddy replaced Tony Digiovanni, who had been president since 2019.

Socially Conscious Education 
Claremont Lincoln University's slogan is "socially conscious education." The university develops curriculum that builds on the fundamentals of "Claremont Core," a set of skills and practices that the university believes students should have after graduation: mindfulness, dialog, collaboration, and change. In addition to the Core, the university aligns its degree programs with socially conscious post-graduate goals.

In 2020, Claremont Lincoln University and the Lincoln Institute for Land Policy announced a new partnership to advance its Masters in Public Administration (MPA) program. The partnership included $100,000 in scholarships/fellowships for incoming students in the masters program to offset the cost of tuition. At the time, Lincoln Institute for Land Policy president and CEO George W. "Mac" McCarthy stated: "We are inspired by the passion of our future leaders, and believe an MPA degree from Claremont Lincoln University will empower them to effectively address challenges such as social inequity, fiscal stress, and climate change in their communities."

In response to a combination of global social and economic challenges (including the COVID-19 pandemic and rising student loan debts for college degrees), the university announced in 2021 that it would be reducing the cost of its tuition for students by 21%. The tuition reduction was meant to ensure that the university demonstrated its commitment to "more affordable, inclusive and accessible" degree programs.

Academic programs
Claremont Lincoln University is accredited by the WASC Senior College and University Commission (WSCUC) to offer the Master of Arts degree in multiple programs in areas such as organizational leadership, healthcare administration, public administration, human resource administration, social impact, and sustainability.

References

External links
Official website

Educational institutions established in 2011
Schools accredited by the Western Association of Schools and Colleges
Private universities and colleges in California
2011 establishments in California